Miss Teen USA 2002, the 20th anniversary of the Miss Teen USA pageant, was televised live from South Padre Island, Texas on 28 August 2002.  At the conclusion of the final competition, Miss Wisconsin Teen USA Vanessa Marie Semrow was crowned by outgoing queen Marissa Whitley of Missouri.

This was the second consecutive year that the pageant was held on South Padre Island, although it had also been held there in 1997.

Semrow was only the second teenager from Wisconsin to place in the pageant, and the first to win the title.  The state's previous placement was in 1984.

In the years after the pageant, two delegates who competed at Miss Teen USA 2002 went on to win the Miss USA title.  The class of 2002 is the first to produce two Miss USA winners.  The first was Tara Conner of Kentucky, who placed second runner-up at Miss Teen USA 2002 and won the Miss USA 2006 pageant; she was followed by Rachel Smith of Tennessee (semi-finalist and Miss Photogenic at Miss Teen USA) who won Miss USA 2007.  Both placed fourth runner-up in the Miss Universe pageant.  A third contestant, fourth runner-up Kimberly Harlan of Georgia, competed at Miss World 2003 but did not place.

Results

Placements

Special awards
Miss Congeniality: Austen Brown (South Carolina)
Miss Photogenic: Rachel Smith (Tennessee)
Best in Swimsuit: Tara Conner (Kentucky)

Final competition score

Historical significance
Wisconsin, Connecticut and Minnesota placed for only the second time, Rhode Island placed for the third time.  Rhode Island last placed in 1992, when Shanna Moakler made the semi-finals.  Wisconsin last placed in 1984, Connecticut in 1993, and Minnesota in 1995. 
Georgia placed for the third consecutive year, the first time this had occurred.
It was the second time in three years that Miss Kentucky Teen USA placed second runner-up.
Rachel Smith (Miss USA 2007) became the second Tennessee teen to win Miss Photogenic. The first Tennessee teen to win the title was Lynnette Cole in 1995 who also went on to win the Miss USA 2000 title. Smith went on to follow her footsteps and win Miss USA 2007, eight years later.
In a rare occurrence, Tara Conner won Miss USA 2006. She then crowned a fellow Miss Teen USA 2002 contestant, Rachel Smith (Miss USA 2007), as her successor.

Delegates
The Miss Teen USA 2002 delegates were:

 Alabama - Hailey Capps
 Alaska - Rachel Garness
 Arizona - Lynsie Shackelford
 Arkansas - Rachael Eggers
 California - Jennifer Morgan
 Colorado - Lindsey Dowling
 Connecticut - Ashley Bickford
 Delaware - Kelly Anne Horst
 District of Columbia - Glovindria Burgess
 Florida - Ashlee Cuza
 Georgia - Kimberley Harlan
 Hawaii - Erin Madden
 Idaho - Katrina Siddoway
 Illinois - Lacey Wilson
 Indiana - Melyssa Ramos
 Iowa - Haley Johnson
 Kansas - Amber Ross
 Kentucky - Tara Conner
 Louisiana - Candice Stewart
 Maine - Megan Jackson
 Maryland - Michelle Attai
 Massachusetts - Amanda Birdsell
 Michigan - Kyleen Krstich
 Minnesota - Alla Ilushka
 Mississippi - Grace Gore
 Missouri - Courtney Ane Chilcutt
 Montana - Meghan Minnick
 Nebraska - Brieanne Bogart
 Nevada - Kathryn Bigler
 New Hampshire - Jennifer Stein
 New Jersey - Sheri Drach
 New Mexico - Amber Evaro
 New York -  Marley Delduchetto
 North Carolina - Brittany Crews
 North Dakota - Jessica Deringer
 Ohio - Renee Jackson
 Oklahoma - Joy Cometti
 Oregon - Kari Ann Peniche
 Pennsylvania - Julienne Shaw
 Rhode Island - Alysha Castonguay  
 South Carolina -  Austen Brown
 South Dakota - Jessica Fjerstad
 Tennessee - Rachel Smith
 Texas - Brittany Tiner
 Utah - Marin Poole
 Vermont - Melinda Karr
 Virginia - Lauren Barnette
 Washington - Maichal McJunkin
 West Virginia - Heather Estep
 Wisconsin - Vanessa Marie Semrow
 Wyoming - Jamie Mader

Contestant notes
Ten contestants later won Miss USA state titles:
Marin Poole (Utah) - Miss Utah USA 2005 (Miss USA 2005 Top 15 semifinalist)
Candice Stewart (Louisiana) - Miss Louisiana USA 2005
Jessica Fjerstad (South Dakota) - Miss South Dakota USA 2005
Tara Conner (Kentucky) - Miss Kentucky USA 2006 (Miss USA 2006) 
Alla Ilushka (Minnesota) - Miss Minnesota USA 2007
Rachel Smith (Tennessee) - Miss Tennessee USA 2007 (Miss USA 2007)
Lauren Barnette (Virginia) - Miss Virginia USA 2007 (Miss USA 2007 Top 10 finalist)
Alysha Castonguay (Rhode Island) - Miss Rhode Island USA 2009
Lacey Wilson (Illinois) - Miss Massachusetts USA 2010
Ashley Bickford (Connecticut) - Miss Connecticut USA 2010; Triple Crown winner
Two contestants later won Miss America state titles:
Grace Gore (Mississippi) - Miss Tennessee 2007 (Miss America 2008 Top 16 Semifinalist)
Ashley Bickford (Connecticut) - Miss Rhode Island 2007 (Miss America 2008 Preliminary Swimsuit winner); Triple Crown winner
The sister of Erin Madden (Hawaii) competed at Miss Teen USA 2000.  The sisters of Jamie Mader (Wyoming) and Rachel Garness (Alaska) both competed at Miss Teen USA 2005.
Alysha Castonguay (Rhode Island) was a cheerleader for the NFL's New England Patriots for two seasons.
Kimberly Harlan (Georgia) competed Miss World United States 2003 and represented the United States in Miss World 2003.

Judges
Chris Beckman
Sam Levine
Maria Menounos
Paige Mycoskie
Cyndi Thomson
Jordi Vilasuso
Cherise Vonae Shulman
Ben Wentworth III

External links
Official website

2002
2002 beauty pageants
2002 in the United States
2002 in Texas